Saskatoon berry pie is a type of pie with a saskatoon berry filling. The pie originated in the Prairies region of Canada and is often served with vanilla ice cream as a dessert. The primary ingredients of saskatoon berry pie include saskatoon berries, pie crust, sugar, cornstarch or flour, butter and lemon zest/juice. The pie is sometimes made with blueberries as a saskatoon berry substitute.

See also 

 List of pies, tarts, and flans
 Blueberry pie

References 

Fruit pies
Canadian desserts